Giovanni Antonio Galli may refer to:
 Giovanni Antonio Galli (physician)
 Giovanni Antonio Galli (artist)

See also
 Giovanni Galli, Italian footballer